Chighab (also Romanized as Chīghāb) is a village in Dasht-e Abbas Rural District, Musian District, Dehloran County, Ilam Province, Iran. At the 2006 census, its population was 63, in 10 families.

References 

Populated places in Dehloran County